"You Can Dream of Me" is a song co-written and recorded by American country music artist Steve Wariner.  It was released in November 1985 as the first single from the album Life's Highway.  The single stayed at number one for a single week and spent a total of twenty-two weeks on the Billboard Hot Country Singles & Tracks chart.  Wariner wrote the song with former Orleans frontman John Hall.

Chart performance

Year-End Chart

References 

1985 singles
1985 songs
Steve Wariner songs
Songs written by Steve Wariner
Song recordings produced by Jimmy Bowen
Song recordings produced by Tony Brown (record producer)
MCA Records singles
Songs written by John Hall (New York politician)